The Reader (Der Vorleser) is a novel by Bernhard Schlink from 1995

The Reader may also refer to:

 The Reader (2008 film), a drama film by Stephen Daldry, based on Bernhard Schlink's novel
 The Reader (1988 film), a French film by Michel Deville,  Raymond Jean's novel "La Lectrice".
 The Reader (magazine), a Liverpool-based literary magazine
 The Reader,  quarterly free magazine in Redlands, California
 The Reader, the first book in Traci Chee's Sea of Ink and Gold trilogy, published in 2016
 A Young Girl Reading, a painting by Jean-Honoré Fragonard
 A TV program by China Central Television, allowing people to express their ideas by reading articles and essays
 The Reader (weekly) (1863–1866), a short-lived British literary publication

See also
 Reader (disambiguation)